Arjun Appadurai (born 1949) is an Indian-American anthropologist recognized as a major theorist in globalization studies. In his anthropological work, he discusses the importance of the modernity of nation states and globalization. He is the former University of Chicago professor of anthropology and South Asian Languages and Civilizations, Humanities Dean of the University of Chicago, director of the city center and globalization at Yale University, and the Education and Human Development Studies professor at NYU Steinhardt School of Culture.

Some of his most important works include Worship and Conflict under Colonial Rule (1981), Disjuncture and Difference in the Global Cultural Economy (1990), of which an expanded version is found in Modernity at Large (1996), and Fear of Small Numbers (2006). He was elected a Fellow of the American Academy of Arts and Sciences in 1997.

Early life
Appadurai was born in 1949, into a Tamil family in Mumbai (Bombay), India and educated in India. He graduated from St. Xavier's High School, Fort, Mumbai, and earned his Intermediate Arts degree from Elphinstone College, Mumbai, before moving to the United States. He then received his B.A. from Brandeis University in 1970.

Career
He was formerly a professor at the University of Chicago where he received his M.A. (1973) and Ph.D (1976) in Anthropology. After working there, he spent a brief time at Yale.

University of Pennsylvania
Appadurai taught for many years at the University of Pennsylvania, in the departments of Anthropology and South Asia Studies.  During his years at Penn, in 1984, he hosted a conference through the Penn Ethnohistory program; this conference led to the publication of the volume called The Social Life of Things: Commodities in Cultural Perspective (1986).  Later he joined the faculty at the New School University. He currently is a faculty member of New York University's Media Culture and Communication department in the Steinhardt School.

Works

Some of his most important works include Worship and Conflict under Colonial Rule (1981), Disjuncture and Difference in the Global Cultural Economy (1990), of which an expanded version is found in Modernity at Large (1996), and Fear of Small Numbers (2006). In The Social Life of Things (1986), Appadurai argued that commodities do not only have economic value; they have political value and social lives as well. He was elected a Fellow of the American Academy of Arts and Sciences in 1997.

His doctoral work was based on the car festival held in the Parthasarathi temple in Triplicane, Madras. Arjun Appadurai is member of the Advisory Board of the Forum d'Avignon, international meetings of culture, the economy and the media. He is also an advisory member of the journal Janus Unbound: Journal of Critical Studies.

New School
In 2004, after a brief time as administrator at Yale University, Appadurai became Provost of New School University. Appadurai's resignation from the Provost's office was announced 30 January 2006 by New School President Bob Kerrey. He held the John Dewey Distinguished Professorship in the Social Sciences at New School. Appadurai became one of the more outspoken critics of President Kerrey when he attempted to appoint himself provost in 2008.

New York University
In 2008 it was announced that Appadurai was appointed Goddard Professor of Media, Culture, and Communication at the NYU Steinhardt School of Culture, Education, and Human Development. Appadurai retired as emeritus from the department in 2021.

Bard Graduate Center
In 2021, Appadurai was appointed Max Weber Global Professor at the Bard Graduate Center, though he is based in Berlin and teaches remotely.

Affiliations 

Appadurai is a co-founder of the academic journal Public Culture; founder of the non-profit Partners for Urban Knowledge, Action and Research (PUKAR) in Mumbai; co-founder and co-director of Interdisciplinary Network on Globalization (ING); and a fellow of the American Academy of Arts and Sciences. He has served as a consultant or advisor to a wide range of public and private organizations, including the Ford, Rockefeller and MacArthur foundations; UNESCO; the World Bank; and the National Science Foundation.

Appadurai has presided over Chicago globalization plan, at many public and private organizations (such as the Ford Foundation, the Rockefeller Foundation, UNESCO, the World Bank, etc.) consultant and long-term concern issues of globalization, modernity and ethnic conflicts.

Appadurai held many scholarships and grants, and has received numerous academic honors, including the Center for Advanced Study in the Behavioral Sciences (California) and the Institute for Advanced Study in Princeton, as well as individual research fellowship from the Open Society Institute (New York). He was elected Arts and Sciences in 1997, the American Academy of Sciences. In 2013, he was awarded an honorary doctorate Erasmus University in the Netherlands. He holds concurrent academic positions as a Mercator Fellow, Free University and Humboldt University, Berlin; Honorary Professor in the Department of Media and Communication at Erasmus University, Rotterdam; and Senior Research Partner at the Max-Planck Institute for Religious and Ethnic Diversity, Gottingen.

He also served as a consultant or adviser, extensive public and private organizations, including many large foundations (Ford, MacArthur and Rockefeller); the UNESCO; UNDP; World Bank; the US National Endowment for the Humanities; National Science Foundation; and Infosys Foundation. He served on the Social Sciences jury for the Infosys Prize in 2010 and 2017. He currently serves as the Asian Art Program Advisory Committee members in the Solomon Guggenheim Museum, and the forum D 'Avignon Paris Scientific Advisory Board.

Theory
In his best known work 'Disjuncture and Difference in the Global Cultural Economy' Appadurai lays out his meta theory of disjuncture. For him the ‘new global cultural economy has to be seen as a complex, overlapping, disjunctive order’. This order is composed of different interrelated, yet disjunctive global cultural flows, specifically the following five:

 ethnoscapes; the migration of people across cultures and borders
 mediascapes; the variety of media that shape the way we understand our world 
 technoscapes; the scope and movement of technology (mechanical and informational) around the world
 financescapes; the worldwide flux of money and capital
 ideoscapes; the global flow of ideas and ideologies

The social imaginary
Appadurai articulated a view of cultural activity known as the social imaginary, which is composed of the five dimensions of global cultural flows.

He describes his articulation of the imaginary as:
The image, the imagined, the imaginary – these are all terms that direct us to something critical and new in global cultural processes: the imagination as a social practice.  No longer mere fantasy (opium for the masses whose real work is somewhere else), no longer simple escape (from a world defined principally by more concrete purposes and structures), no longer elite pastime (thus not relevant to the lives of ordinary people), and no longer mere contemplation (irrelevant for new forms of desire and subjectivity), the imagination has become an organized field of social practices, a form of work (in the sense of both labor and culturally organized practice), and a form of negotiation between sites of agency (individuals) and globally defined fields of possibility. This unleashing of the imagination links the play of pastiche (in some settings) to the terror and coercion of states and their competitors.  The imagination is now central to all forms of agency, is itself a social fact, and is the key component of the new global order.

Appadurai credits Benedict Anderson with developing notions of imagined communities. Some key figures who have worked on the imaginary are Cornelius Castoriadis, Charles Taylor, Jacques Lacan (who especially worked on the symbolic, in contrast with imaginary and the real), and Dilip Gaonkar. However, Appadurai's ethnography of urban social movements in the city of Mumbai has proved to be contentious with several scholars like the Canadian anthropologist, Judith Whitehead arguing that SPARC (an organization which Appadurai espouses as an instance of progressive social activism in housing) being complicit in the World Bank's agenda for re-developing Mumbai.

Publications
2016 Banking on Words: The Failure of Language in the Age of Derivative Finance. The University of Chicago Press.

2013 The Future as Cultural Fact: Essays on the Global Condition. Verso.

2012 Co-editor (with A. Mack) India's World: The Politics of Creativity in a Globalized Society.

2007 Worship and Conflict under Colonial Rule: A South Indian Case. Cambridge University Press.

2006 Fear of Small Numbers: An Essay on the Geography of Anger. Durham, NC: Duke University Press.

2002 Globalization (edited volume). Durham, NC: Duke University Press.

2001 Deep democracy: urban governmentality and the horizon of politics. Environment and Urbanization, (Vol. 13 No. 2), pp. 23–43.

2001 La Modernidad Desbordada.  (Translation of Modernity At Large) Uruguay and Argentina: Ediciones Trilces and Fondo de Cultura Economica de Argentina.

2001  Apres le Colonialisme: Les Consequences Culturelles de la globalisation. (Translation of Modernity At Large) Paris: Payot.

2001 Modernità in polvere.  (Translation of Modernity At Large) Rome: Meltemi Editore.

1996 Modernity At Large: Cultural Dimensions of Globalization. Minneapolis: University of Minnesota Press.

1991 Co-editor (with M. Mills and F. Korom, Eds.), Gender, Genre and Power in South Asian Expressive Traditions. Philadelphia: University of Pennsylvania Press.

1988 Guest Editor, Special Issue of Cultural Anthropology on "Place and Voice in Anthropological Theory" (Vol. 3, No. 1).

1988 "How to Make a National Cuisine: Cookbooks in Contemporary India," Comparative Studies in Society and History (Vol. 31, No. 1): 3-24. 
1987 Guest Editor (with Carol A. Breckenridge), Special Annual Issue of The India Magazine (New Delhi) on "Public Culture".

1986 The Social Life of Things: Commodities in Cultural Perspective (edited volume). New York: Cambridge University Press.

1983 (Reprint). Worship and Conflict Under Colonial Rule: A South Indian Case. New Delhi: Orient Longman.

1981 Worship and Conflict Under Colonial Rule: A South Indian Case. Cambridge: Cambridge University Press.

See also
 Commodity Pathway Diversion

References

External links
Official website
 Arjun Appadurai, "Patience" in the art-and-culture journal "Brooklyn Rail" (New York) (September 2021): https://brooklynrail.org/2021/09/criticspage/Patience
An A–Z of Theory: Arjun Appadurai by Andrew Robinson (Ceasefire Magazin, 22 April 2011)
Fear of Small Numbers by Arjun Appadurai (Duke University Press, 2006)
Globalization edited by Arjun Appadurai (Duke University Press, 2001)
Disjuncture and Difference in the Global Cultural Economy (1990), PDF
 Arjun Appadurai. "Patience" in Brooklyn Rail (September 2021), as part of section "How Long Is Now?" guest edited by Francesca Pietropaolo: https://brooklynrail.org/2021/09/criticspage

1949 births
Living people
Tamil scholars
Indian emigrants to the United States
Writers from Mumbai
American anthropologists
University of Mumbai alumni
Brandeis University alumni
University of Chicago alumni
University of Chicago faculty
New York University faculty
American people of Indian Tamil descent
American social sciences writers
Fellows of the American Academy of Arts and Sciences
Indian Tamil academics
Writers about globalization
American male writers of Indian descent
Indian political writers
20th-century Indian non-fiction writers
Indian social sciences writers
American male non-fiction writers